Wescot-Williams cabinet  may refer to:

 First Wescot-Williams cabinet, the cabinet of Sint Maarten under Prime Minister Sarah Wescot-Williams, 2010–2012
 Second Wescot-Williams cabinet, the cabinet of Sint Maarten under Prime Minister Sarah Wescot-Williams, 2012–2013
 Third Wescot-Williams cabinet, the cabinet of Sint Maarten under Prime Minister Sarah Wescot-Williams, 2013–2014